Shevchenko is a crater on Mercury.  Its name was adopted by the International Astronomical Union (IAU) in 1976, for Ukrainian poet Taras Hryhorovych Shevchenko.

On the west rim of Shevchenko is an unnamed smaller crater that has sharp features and contains hollows.

References